"Go back to where you came from" is a racist or xenophobic epithet which is used in many different countries, and it is mainly used to target immigrants and/or ethnic groups whose members are falsely considered to be immigrants. 

In contemporary United States, it is frequently directed at Asian Americans and Hispanic Americans, and it is sometimes also directed towards African Americans, and Slavic Americans. There is also a common variant of the phrase that has been popularized by the Ku Klux Klan: "Go back to your country." The phrase has a long history which goes back at least as far as 1798. It was originally used in the US by White Anglo-Saxon Protestants and targeted at other European immigrants, such as Irish, Italians, Poles, and Jews.

The phrase was popularized during World War I and World War II in relation to German Americans, who were subject to suspicion, discrimination, and violence. The term is often accompanied with an erroneous assumption of the target's origin, as Hispanic Americans are often told to "Go back to Mexico!", Slavic and other Eastern European Americans are told to return to Russia, Asian Americans often told to "go back to China" even if they are not a Chinese American, and African Americans to "go back to Africa." The message conveys a sense that the person is "not supposed to be there, or that it isn't their place." The speaker is presumed to be a "real" American, but the target of the remark is not.

Such phrases are deemed by the United States federal government and the court system to be discriminatory in the workplace. Their use has been accepted as evidence of workplace discrimination in cases brought before the Equal Employment Opportunity Commission (EEOC), a federal government agency that "enforces federal law to make sure employees are not discriminated against for their gender, sex, national origin or age." EEOC documents specifically cite the use of the comment "Go back to where you came from," as the example of unlawful workplace conduct by co-workers and supervisors, along with the use of "insults, taunting, or ethnic epithets, such as making fun of a person's accent," deemed to be "harassment based on national origin."

Background

The Equal Employment Opportunity Commission (EEOC) is a federal government agency that "enforces federal law to make sure employees are not discriminated against for their gender, sex, national origin or age".

EEOC documents defining "harassment based on national origin" specifically cite the use of the comment "Go back to where you came from", as the example of "unlawful" workplace conduct by co-workers and supervisors if its use is creates an "intimidating, hostile, or offensive working environment, interfere[s] with work performance, or negatively affect[s] job opportunities". Other "illegal" workplace behavior includes the use of "insults, taunting, or ethnic epithets, such as making fun of a person's accent".

According to a July 20, 2019, CNN article, the United States Equal Employment Opportunity Commission has used phrases, such as, "Go back to where you came from" as evidence of workplace discrimination.

Examples
According to an August 31, 2003, Houston Chronicle article, a car salesman of East Indian descent who was Muslim had been hired at a Texas car dealership in May 2001. He began to be subjected to taunts by his co-workers including "go back where you came from" post 9/11. He filed a complaint with the EEOC in 2003 after he was fired from the dealership in 2002. According to CNN, in rendering their decision to side with the EEOC case on behalf of the salesman and against the car dealership accused of creating a "hostile work environment based on ... national origin and religion", the United States Court of Appeals for the Fifth Circuit "cited the example" several times of the repeated use of the phrase "just go back where [he] came from". By 2003, allegedly as part of the post-9/11 backlash, over 943 discrimination complaints were filed to the EEOC leading to over 115 lawsuits.

On July 14, 2019, President Donald Trump used the phrase to refer to four American congresswomen of color in a tweet, stating "Why don't they go back and help fix the totally broken and crime infested places from which they came...", even though three of the four are native-born Americans. The tweet drew controversy due to Donald Trump's history of racially-charged comments. According to CNN legal analyst Laura Coates, the statement, "although obviously racist to the public," may not be unlawful, because EEOC guidelines only apply to work environments and "the United States Congress and its members do not work for the President." In response to Trump's tweet, The New York Times invited readers to comment. They received accounts from 16,000 readers of their "experiences of being told to 'go back'."

Global usage

Europe
Numerous articles which are related to racism in Europe cite the use of the phrase and its variations in many European countries. In 2009, a nurse who worked in a Södertälje Hospital in Sweden complained to management about the way the staff treated patients who had immigrant backgrounds, citing examples of verbal harassment such as "go back to Arabia". The nurse lost his job.

Incidents of verbal harassment based on ethnicity in Italy include the 2018 beating of a 19-year-old man from Senegal, who had requested political asylum and was working as a server in Palermo. He was attacked by three Sicilian men and told to "Go back to your country, dirty nigger". Their actions were denounced by Monsignor Michele Pennisi, the Archbishop of Monreale, who expressed the "strongest condemnation of this act of racism, of xenophobia" that does not reflect the "attitude of Christians and of many men of good will in Sicily".

On 28 January 2020, André Ventura leader of Chega provoked an outcry in Parliament by saying that black Joacine Katar Moreira, a Guinea-Bissau-born Assembly member who wanted museum items from Portugal's former colonies to be returned, be to "sent back to her country of origin. It would be a lot better for everyone".

On 3 November 2022, National Rally deputy Grégoire de Fournas interrupted Black deputy Carlos Martens Bilongo , shouting "go back to Africa!".

Africa
The phrase was used during the 2015 South African xenophobic riots, in which immigrants—including African expatriates from other African countries—were blamed for the high unemployment rate of South Africans. The Los Angeles Times'' said that South Africa's high unemployment rate has been the catalyst for violent attacks in South Africa against migrants from Pakistan, Bangladesh, and other African countries who are blamed for "stealing jobs and undercutting small businesses owned by South Africans". There was a wave of xenophobic killings in South Africa in 2008, in which 62 people were killed.

Asia
In Malaysia, parliament members sometimes told politicians of Chinese descent to "balik Cina" (go back to China), especially if they are members of DAP.

See also
Pendatang asing – meaning "foreign visitor", which is also used for non-Bumiputera Malays.
Perpetual foreigner, which disproportionately affects Asian Americans

Notes

References

Further reading

Aftermath of the September 11 attacks
Anti-immigration politics in the United States
Ethically disputed political practices
Ethnic and racial stereotypes in the United States
Equal Employment Opportunity Commission
Freedom of speech
Harassment
Hate speech
Linguistic controversies
Political terminology
Race legislation in the United States
Racism in the United States
United States administrative law
Xenophobia
Bullying